The R504 Kolyma Highway (Federal'naya Avtomobil'naya Doroga «Kolyma», "Federal Automobile Highway 'Kolyma'"), part of the M56 route, is a road through the Russian Far East. It connects Magadan with the town of Nizhny Bestyakh, located on the eastern bank of Lena River, opposite of Yakutsk. At Nizhny Bestyakh the Kolyma Highway connects to the Lena Highway.

The Kolyma Highway is colloquially known as the Road of Bones (Russian: Дорога Костей, transliteration: Doróga Kostyéy), in reference to the hundreds of thousands of forced laborers who were interred in the pavement after dying during its construction. Locally, the road is known as the Kolyma Route (Russian: Колымская трасса, transliteration: Kolýmskaya trássa).

History

The Dalstroy construction directorate built the Kolyma Highway during the Soviet Union's Stalinist era. Inmates of the Sevvostlag labour camp started the first stretch in 1932, and construction continued with the use of gulag labour until 1953.

The road is treated as a memorial by some, as the bones of the estimated 250,0001,000,000 imprisoned laborers who died while constructing it were allegedly laid beneath or around the road, although documented sources have yet to confirm this through further evidence. As the road is built on permafrost, the popular rumor spread through western and dissident accounts is that interment into the fabric of the road was deemed more practical than digging new holes to bury the bodies of the dead.

Present
In 2008, the road was granted Federal Road status, and is now a frequently maintained all-weather gravel road.

When the road was upgraded, the route was changed to bypass the section from Kyubeme to Kadykchan via Tomtor, and instead pass from Kyubeme to Kadykchan via a more northern route through the town of Ust-Nera. The old 420 km section via Tomtor was largely unmaintained; the 200 km section between Tomtor and Kadykchan was completely abandoned. This section is known as the Old Summer Road, and has fallen into disrepair, with washed-out bridges and sections of road reclaimed by streams in summer. During winter, frozen rivers may assist river crossings. Old Summer Road remains one of the great challenges for adventuring motorcyclists and 4WDers.

The area is extremely cold during the winter. The town of Oymyakon, approximately 100 km from the highway, is believed to be the coldest inhabited place on earth. The average low temperature in Oymyakon in January is −50°C. In 2020, a teenage motorist froze to death by following Google Maps directions to use the shorter but abandoned section of the road via Tomtor, on which his car broke down, and his surviving travel mate lost most of his limbs due to frostbite.

Route

There is also a scenic shortcut from Magadan to Susuman via Ust-Omchug called the Tenkinskaya Trassa, which receives a lot less heavy traffic than the main section of the M56 between Magadan and Susuman.

Distances: Yakutsk to Khandyga , on to Kyubeme , to Kadykchan (via Tomtor) , Kadykchan to Susuman , Susuman to Magadan .

As of summer 2010, the Old Summer Road via Tomtor was still passable to motorcycles and 4×4s.

Road to Chukotka
The construction of the first 50 kilometers of the road started in 2012.

See also

Gulag
Amur Cart Road
Dempster Highway a similar highway in Canada

Notes

References
 Bloom, L. R. and Vince, A. E. (2006) Mondo enduro: the ultimate adventure on two wheels – 44,000 miles in 400 days, Findon: RippingYarns.com, 
 McGregor, E., Boorman, C.  and Uhlig R. (2005) Long way round : chasing shadows across the world, London : Time Warner, 
 Pedersen, H., Payne, D. and Squire, S. (1998) 10 Years on 2 Wheels: 77 Countries, 250,000 Miles, Elfin Cove Press, 
 Scott, A. (2008) The Road Gets Better From Here, Vivid Publishing, 
 The Long Course route and GPS track 
 Thompson, G. (2002) Kolyma – The Road of Death, The Mission Reporter, Florida : Dundee, www site [accessed 21 May 2007]
 Turtle Expedition 
 AskYakutia.com : Road condition reports

External links

Description of a road expedition Yakutsk-Magadan and back
Zoltan Szalkai made a documentary of Gulag camp of Kolyma.
 Documentary  *** GOLD*** - lost in Siberia  was filmed in the summer of 1993 in Magadan, and along the Road of Bones, through Ust-Omchug and Susuman to the Sverovostok Zoloto gold mine, Siberia, by the first foreign film crew ever, visiting the Kolyma District -which had been under control of the Soviet secret service, under the company name Dalstroj, for over 60 years.

Roads in Siberia
Roads in the Russian Far East
Transport in the Sakha Republic
Transport in Magadan Oblast
Gulag industry
Magadan